Acacia karina is a shrub belonging to the genus Acacia and the subgenus Juliflorae. It is native to a small area in the Mid West and Goldfields regions of Western Australia.

Taxonomy
The species was described by Bruce Maslin and Carrie Buscumb and published in 2007.
The specific epithet commemorates Karina Knight, who held a thirty year career manager of the Western Australian Herbarium and has contributed to the systematics of the acacia genus. A vernacular name for the species given by the authors is Karina's acacia.
The holotype was obtained at a location east of Morawa in 2006, the precise location being suppressed for conservation purposes.

Description
A  species of Acacia, growing as a woody shrub that is straggly in habit. Associated with banded iron formation, the species is found on rocky inclines growing in silty red-brown clay containing pebbles of ironstone or shale.
The phyllodes of Acacia karina exhibit hairs closely pressed to the nerve of its structure.

Identified from material obtained near Morawa, the known distribution range is the Yalgoo and Perenjori districts of the Eremaean Province in Western Australia.

See also
List of Acacia species

References

karina
Acacias of Western Australia
Plants described in 2007
Taxa named by Bruce Maslin